Spenceriella is a genus of worms in the family Megascolecidae that is now included in the prior genus Anisochaeta although some other species are transferred to Celeriella.

Species

 Spenceriella aemula (Blakemore, 2000)
 Spenceriella ancisa (Blakemore, 2000)
 Spenceriella andersoni (Spencer, 1900)
 Spenceriella angusticlavia (Blakemore, 2000)
 Spenceriella aterpaenulata (Blakemore, 2000)
 Spenceriella australis (Fletcher, 1886)
 Spenceriella austrina (Fletcher, 1886)
 Spenceriella bennetti Dyne, 2000
 Spenceriella buckerfieldi (Blakemore, 1997)
 Spenceriella bulla (Blakemore, 2000)
 Spenceriella bywongensis Jamieson, 2001
 Spenceriella calamonis Dyne, 2000
 Spenceriella calpetana (Blakemore, 2000)
 Spenceriella calvasaxea (Blakemore, 2000)
 Spenceriella campestris Dyne, 2000
 Spenceriella celmisiae (Jamieson, 1973)
 Spenceriella conondalei Jamieson, 1995
 Spenceriella conspecta (Blakemore, 2000)
 Spenceriella cormieri Jamieson & Wampler, 1979
 Spenceriella crateris Dyne, 2000
 Spenceriella curtisi Jamieson & Wampler, 1979
 Spenceriella difficilis Jamieson, 1977
 Spenceriella erica (Blakemore, 2000)
 Spenceriella exigua (Fletcher, 1887)
 Spenceriella fardyi (Spencer, 1900)
 Spenceriella fecunda (Fletcher, 1887)
 Spenceriella flava (Blakemore, 2000)
 Spenceriella garilarsoni (Blakemore, 2000)
 Spenceriella hallii (Spencer, 1892)
 Spenceriella hamiltoni (Fletcher, 1887)
 Spenceriella hoggi (Spencer, 1892)
 Spenceriella hoggii Spencer, 1892
 Spenceriella hollowayi Jamieson, 1977
 Spenceriella howeana Jamieson, 1977
 Spenceriella ima (Blakemore, 2000)
 Spenceriella imparicystis Jamieson, 1974
 Spenceriella indissimilis (Fletcher, 1889)
 Spenceriella inermis (Stephenson, 1933)
 Spenceriella jenolanensis (Boardman, 1943)
 Spenceriella larpentensis (Spencer, 1900)
 Spenceriella lata (Blakemore, 2000)
 Spenceriella lavatiolacuna (Blakemore, 2000)
 Spenceriella liberalis (Blakemore, 2000)
 Spenceriella longiductis (Blakemore, 1997)
 Spenceriella macleayi (Fletcher, 1889)
 Spenceriella macquariensis (Fletcher, 1890)
 Spenceriella manningi Jamieson, 2001
 Spenceriella megagaster (Blakemore, 1997)
 Spenceriella minor (Spencer, 1900)
 Spenceriella mjoebergi (Michaelsen, 1916)
 Spenceriella montanus (Spencer, 1900)
 Spenceriella monticola (Fletcher, 1887)
 Spenceriella murrayana (Fletcher, 1887)
 Spenceriella nevillensis Jamieson, 2001
 Spenceriella noctiluca Jamieson & Wampler, 1979
 Spenceriella notabilis (Spencer, 1900)
 Spenceriella novaeanglica (Blakemore, 2000)
 Spenceriella novocombei (Blakemore, 1997)
 Spenceriella palustris (Blakemore, 2000)
 Spenceriella paucula (Blakemore, 2000)
 Spenceriella penolaensis Jamieson, 1974
 Spenceriella pilularis Dyne, 2000
 Spenceriella pusilla Dyne, 2000
 Spenceriella rava (Blakemore, 2000)
 Spenceriella raymondiana (Fletcher, 1887)
 Spenceriella rodwayi (Stephenson, 1931)
 Spenceriella rubeospina (Blakemore, 2000)
 Spenceriella rubra (Spencer, 1892)
 Spenceriella saundersi Jamieson, 1977
 Spenceriella sebastiani (Blakemore, 1997)
 Spenceriella steelii (Spencer, 1892)
 Spenceriella sylvatica (Spencer, 1892)
 Spenceriella tenax (Fletcher, 1886)
 Spenceriella thannae Dyne, 2000
 Spenceriella toonumbari (Blakemore, 2000)
 Spenceriella tunicata (Blakemore, 2000)
 Spenceriella variabilis Dyne, 2000
 Spenceriella virgata (Blakemore, 2000)
 Spenceriella virgultis Dyne, 2000
 Spenceriella wiburdi (Boardman, 1943)
 Spenceriella wilsoniana (Fletcher, 1887)
 Spenceriella xylicola Dyne, 2000
 Spenceriella yabbratigris (Blakemore, 2000)

References

 TerraNature
 

Megascolecidae